Xavier or Xabier may refer to:

Place
 Xavier, Spain

People
 Xavier (surname)
 Xavier (given name)
 Francis Xavier (1506–1552), Catholic saint
 St. Francis Xavier (disambiguation)
 St. Xavier (disambiguation)
 Xavier (footballer, born January 1980) (Anderson Conceição Xavier), Brazilian midfielder
 Xavier (footballer, born March 1980) (José Xavier Costa), Brazilian left-back
 Xavier (footballer, born 2000) (João Vitor Xavier de Almeida), Brazilian midfielder
 Xavier (wrestler), American professional wrestler

Arts and entertainment
 Xavier: Renegade Angel, an animated TV series
 Xavier Institute, a fictional school in Marvel comics
 Charles Xavier, Professor X, a fictional Marvel Comics character
 "Xavier", a song by Casseurs Flowters from the 2015 soundtrack album Comment c'est loin
 "Xavier", a song by Dead Can Dance from the 1987 album Within the Realm of a Dying Sun

Other uses
 Xavier University, in Cincinnati, U.S.
 Tropical Storm Xavier, the name of several storms
 Drive PX Xavier, an Nvidia Drive
 Tegra#Xavier,  a system on a chip

See also

 Javier (disambiguation)